Battles of Westeros is a 2010 strategic wargame set in George R.R. Martin’s A Song of Ice and Fire universe. It was designed by Robert A. Kouba and published by Fantasy Flight Games.

Awards 

 2011 JoTa Best Wargame Critic Award
 2011 JoTa Best Wargame Audience Award
 2011 JoTa Best 2-Player Board Game Critic Award
 2011 JoTa Best 2-Player Board Game Audience Award
 2011 International Gamers Award - General Strategy: Two-players Nominee
 2010 Golden Geek Best Wargame Nominee
 2010 Golden Geek Best 2-Player Board Game Nominee

References

External links 

 

Board games introduced in 2010
Fantasy board wargames
Fantasy Flight Games games
Games based on A Song of Ice and Fire
Licensed board games